Sand One, also known as Sand Oner, is a public artist.

Biography 
One was born and raised in Los Angeles. Sand One is a Latina artist, her mother is from Mexico and her father is from Guatemala. She was raised by her mother in East Los Angeles and represents her neighborhood in her art.

Growing up, Sand One was surrounded by art and graffiti. She dropped out of high school in order to pursue art. Because most of her art pieces are on public property, One asks for legal permission before starting any piece.

Notable Art 
One started as a graffiti artist and her earlier work can be seen throughout Los Angeles on small businesses' walls, on the sides of trucks, and on busy streets. Now as her art has developed, audiences can see her art in art galleries, her own art studio, and on merchandise, she decides to create. Sand does not consider her art graffiti, she classifies it as “chick urban street art.”

Bow Ties: Sandoner (2011) 
 This was One’s “first solo exhibition in Los Angeles.”  The exhibition includes her signature dolls in tuxedos and bowties. This exhibition was at the Casa de La Cultural Galleria from April 29 to May 7, 2011.

The Thug Love Collection (2016) 

 This is a collection of acrylic canvases depicting signature dolls and teddy bears. This collection was at Ewkuks Art Gallery in Los Angeles, CA from January 2 to February 29, 2016.

Maria in East L.A. (2017) 

 This is a graffiti mural on a wall of “Edith’s Market Super Store #1.” This mural is in East Los Angeles on 5th street and Ford Boulevard and was painted on April 2017.

Long Beach Mermaid (2022) 

 This is a custom acrylic and aerosol canvas depicting a mermaid at Long Beach in One’s Signature style. The pieces was delivered to Centro CHA (Community Hispanic Association) Inc. on October 21, 2022 and is currently at the center.

References

External links 
 Sand Oner Website

Living people
American artists of Mexican descent
Hispanic and Latino American artists
21st-century American women artists
Hispanic and Latino American women in the arts
Artists from Los Angeles
Year of birth missing (living people)